Bulimina is a genus of foraminifers belonging to the family Buliminidae.

The genus has cosmopolitan distribution.

Species

Species:

Bulimina abatissae 
Bulimina acicula 
Bulimina aculeata

References

Enidae